Mediterranean 1901–02 was a battle honour awarded to the following Militia battalions of the British Army for their service during the Second Boer War of 1899–1902, when they performed garrison duty in the Mediterranean, relieving regular Army battalions for active service:

 3rd Battalion, the Northumberland Fusiliers (Northumberland Light Infantry Regiment of Militia)
 3rd Battalion, the West Yorkshire Regiment (2nd West Yorkshire Light Infantry)
 3rd Battalion, the Royal West Kent Regiment (West Kent Regiment of Militia)
 3rd Battalion, the Seaforth Highlanders (Highland Rifle Militia)
 5th Battalion, the Royal Fusiliers (Royal Westminster, or 3rd Middlesex Militia)
 3rd Battalion, the Loyal North Lancashire Regiment (1st Royal Lancashire Regiment of Militia (The Duke of Lancaster's Own))
 3rd Battalion, the King's Own Yorkshire Light Infantry (1st West Yorkshire Regiment of Militia)
 5th Battalion, the Royal Munster Fusiliers (Royal Limerick County Militia (Fusiliers))

Personnel of these battalions were awarded the Queen's Mediterranean Medal.

This should not be confused with the award Mediterranean which was awarded for service in the Crimean War.

References
Norman, C.B.: Battle Honours Of The British Army, From Tangier, 1662, To The Commencement Of The Reign Of King Edward VII. John Murray 1911, p. 11

Battle honours of the British Army
Battle honours of the Second Boer War